Sylvia Schweiger (born 4 January 1959) is an Austrian cross-country skier. She competed in two events at the 1976 Winter Olympics.

Cross-country skiing results

Olympic Games

References

1959 births
Living people
Austrian female cross-country skiers
Olympic cross-country skiers of Austria
Cross-country skiers at the 1976 Winter Olympics
Sportspeople from Graz
20th-century Austrian women